Walter Bowman Russell (May 19, 1871 – May 19, 1963) was an impressionist American painter (of the Boston School), sculptor, autodidact and author. His lectures and writing place him firmly in the New Thought Movement. He wrote that Religion and Science must come together in a New Age.

With Lao Russell at Swannanoa in Virginia 1948–1963
Russell's life was changed in 1946 by a phone call from Daisy (Cook) Stebbing, an immigrant from England, a former model and businesswoman, who was living in Boston. She had read Glenn Clark's book The Man Who Tapped the Secrets of the Universe. In 1948, Walter at age 77 divorced his first wife and married Stebbing, age 44, amid some controversy. She changed her name to Lao (after Lao-Tzu, the Chinese illuminate) and they embarked on a cross-country automobile trip from Reno looking for a place to establish a workplace and a museum for his work. They discovered Swannanoa, the palatial estate of a railroad magnate, long abandoned, on a mountaintop on the border of Augusta and Nelson Counties in Virginia, and leased the property for 50 years.

There they established the museum and the Walter Russell Foundation, and in 1957 the Commonwealth of Virginia granted a charter for the University of Science and philosophy, a correspondence school with a home study course. (In 2014, the charter was grandfathered back to 1948.) The Russells collaborated on a number of books. The testing of atomic bombs in the atmosphere prompted them to publish Atomic Suicide? in 1957, in which they warned of grave consequences for the planet and humankind if radioactivity was exploited as a world fuel. Walter Russell died in 1963. Lao died in 1988.

Books

The Sea Children, 1901
The Bending of the Twig, 1903
The Age of Innocence, 1904
The Universal One, 1926
The Russell Genero-Radiative Concept or The Cyclic Theory of Continuous Motion, L. Middleditch Co., 1930
The Secret of Light, 1st ed., 1947, 3rd ed., Univ of Science & Philosophy, 1994, 
The Message of the Divine Iliad, vol. 1, 1948, vol. 2, 1949
The Book of Early Whisperings, 1949
The Home Study Course, (with Lao Russell), 1st ed., 1950–52
Scientific Answer to Human Relations, (with Lao Russell), Univ of Science & Philosophy, 1951
A New Concept of the Universe, Univ of Science & Philosophy, 1953
Atomic Suicide?, (with Lao Russell), Univ of Science & Philosophy, 1957
The World Crisis: Its Explanation and Solution, (with Lao Russell), Univ of Science & Philosophy, 1958
The One-World Purpose, (with Lao Russell), Univ of Science & Philosophy, 1960

References

Further reading
Binder, Timothy A., In the Wave Lies the Secret of Creation, (contains many unpublished drawings of Walter Russell), Univ of Science & Philosophy, 1995,

External links

 The University of Science and Philosophy

1871 births
1963 deaths
American philosophers
American science writers
New Age writers
Philosophical cosmologists
Writers from Boston
20th-century American painters
20th-century American sculptors
American portrait painters